Discosaurus is an extinct genus of Cretaceous plesiosaur first discovered in Alabama by Joseph Leidy. It was argued to be the same animal as Elasmosaurus.

See also
 Timeline of plesiosaur research

 List of plesiosaurs

References

http://www.oceansofkansas.com/Leidy1870b.html

Bibliography and Catalogue of the Fossil Vertebrata of North America, Issue 179 by Oliver Perry Hay

Cretaceous plesiosaurs of North America
Cretaceous plesiosaurs
Cretaceous reptiles of North America
Nomina dubia